Uxbridge, Massachusetts has 53 sites on the National Register of Historic Places.

The locations of National Register properties and districts (at least for all showing latitude and longitude coordinates below) may be seen in an online map by clicking on "Map of all coordinates".

Uxbridge

|}

Former listing

|}

References

External links

City Town Info on Uxbridge - secondary source
National Register Focus database , National Park Service.

Uxbridge, Massachusetts
Uxbridge
Uxbridge, Massachusetts
National Register of Historic Places in Uxbridge, Massachusetts